The Atari Flashback series are a line of dedicated video game consoles designed, produced, published and marketed by AtGames under license from Atari SA. The Flashback consoles are "plug-and-play" versions of the Atari 2600 console. They contain built-in games rather than using the ROM cartridges utilized by the 2600. Most of the games are classics that were previously released for the 2600, although some Flashback consoles include previously unreleased prototype games as well. 

The series began in November 2004, with the release of the original Atari Flashback, designed by Legacy Engineering Group. It features 20 games, including 15 that were originally released for the Atari 2600 and five that were released for the Atari 7800. The Flashback was designed to resemble a smaller version of the 7800. Each subsequent home console in the series is modeled after the 2600, and the original Flashback is the only one that includes games from the 7800 library.

The Atari Flashback 2 was released in 2005, and includes 40 built-in games. The Flashback 3 was released in 2011, and was the first in the series to be manufactured by AtGames. Additional Flashback models have since been released by the company. The Flashback 7 debuted in 2016, and includes the same games as its predecessor, but features Frogger as an additional game. AtGames also introduced a handheld console, the Atari Flashback Portable, in 2016.

Several variations of the Flashback 8 were released in 2017, including the Gold edition, which introduces scan line filtering, a gameplay rewind feature, and HDMI output. The latest home console, the Flashback 50th Anniversary Edition, was released by AtGames in 2022.

A video game was also released under the Atari Flashback brand in 2016.

Home consoles

Original console

The original Atari Flashback was released in November 2004, with a retail price of $45. The console resembles a smaller version of the Atari 7800, and its controllers are also smaller versions of the 7800's joystick controllers, but with the addition of "pause" and "select" buttons. The controllers are not compatible with the original 7800 console. It was designed by Atari veteran Curt Vendel and his company Legacy Engineering Group, which designs other home video game and video arcade products.

The console lacks a cartridge slot, making it incompatible with 7800 games. Instead, the console features 20 built-in games, including 15 Atari 2600 games and five 7800 games. Some of the games originally required analog paddle controllers, and were made to work with the included joysticks. The Atari Flashback runs on "NES-on-a-chip", rather than Atari hardware. As a result, its games do not match their original counterparts entirely. The game library includes Saboteur, a game that went unreleased for 20 years.

The Flashback sold approximately 500,000 units. Craig Harris of IGN was critical of the game conversions and opined that original copies of these games were superior, writing "it's just horrifying to see Atari, a company that outright owns these games and the original hardware, produce such shoddy renditions of the classic 2600 and 7800 games." Harris complained of problems such as flicker, poor collision detection, and missing sound. He praised the controllers for their reduced size, finding them more comfortable to use, but he was disappointed that they are incompatible with the original 7800.

Atari Flashback 2

The Atari Flashback 2 was released in August 2005, as an improved version of its predecessor. It retailed for $30, and includes 40 built-in Atari 2600 games. It is a small near-replica of the 2600, about two-thirds the size of the original. Its controllers are also replicas of the 2600 joysticks. The 2600 and Flashback 2 controllers are compatible with both systems.

Instead of switches, the Flashback 2 console has several buttons, some of which are used to adjust power and reset it. A "select" button is used to choose between single-player and multiplayer modes, for certain games that offer the latter. Two other buttons are used to adjust the joystick difficulty for the left and right controller respectively. An AV cord is hardwired into the back of the console. The back also has a switch to toggle games between color and black-and-white.

Vendel and Legacy Engineering returned to develop the Flashback 2. In designing it, Vendel relied on materials from his Atari History Museum. He recreated the original Atari hardware on a single chip, allowing games to run as they originally did. The console's hardware makes it easy to mod. The Flashback 2's motherboard can be altered to accept 2600 cartridges, a concept that the console was designed around.

The Flashback 2 was better received compared to its predecessor. John Falcone of CNET praised the controllers and considered them the best aspect of the console. The Flashback 2 sold 860,000 units in the United States. A PAL version was never released. The console was discontinued in 2006.

In 2011, Atari Interactive filed a $30 million lawsuit against Tommo, accusing the latter of knowingly selling pirated Flashback 2 consoles.

Games
Aside from the 40 built-in games, the Flashback 2 also contains two secret games (Super Breakout and Warlords), which are accessible through a combination of joystick moves on the console's main menu. Five of the 40 games are prototypes that were previously unreleased. While the original Flashback only includes games published by Atari, the Flashback 2 features two games by Activision: Pitfall! and River Raid. A few of the included games are homebrews.

Some games, such as Lunar Lander, exhibit some flicker. This is due to limitations in the original Atari 2600 hardware, which the Flashback 2 reproduces accurately. Vendel noted that the games exclusive to the Flashback 2 were programmed under a strict schedule. For a revision of the Flashback 2, Vendel commissioned developers to tweak these games in order to reduce flickering.

Atari Flashback 2+
In January 2010, Atari announced pre-orders for the Atari Flashback 2+, to be released on February 22, 2010. It includes 20 classic Atari 2600 games and 20 new Atari games. The game lineup is mostly the same as the original Flashback 2. However, games such as Pitfall!, River Raid, and Wizard do not appear, and are instead replaced by sports games.

Atari Flashback 3

The Atari Flashback 3 was manufactured by AtGames, and was released in September 2011. The Flashback 3 includes 60 built-in Atari 2600 games, 2 joysticks, and a case design that is similar to the Flashback 2. Unlike its predecessors, the Flashback 3 uses emulation. It cannot be modded to play 2600 cartridges.

PCMag opined that some of the games were inferior to their original arcade counterparts.

Atari Flashback 4
The Atari Flashback 4 was released by AtGames on November 13, 2012. The console looks similar to its predecessor, but includes wireless joystick controllers. Like its predecessor, the Flashback 4 uses emulation. The console increased its library to 75 games, 15 more than the Flashback 3.

AtGames also released several alternate versions, including the Atari Flashback 4: 40th Anniversary Deluxe Edition. This included a set of replica Atari 2600 paddles, five collectible posters, and a copy of the original Atari joystick patent signed by Nolan Bushnell. AtGames also developed the Atari Flashback 64, a Walmart exclusive version with wired controllers and only 64 games, including Space Invaders. Some versions of the Flashback 4 include a 76th "bonus" game, Millipede.

Atari Flashback 5
The Atari Flashback 5 was released on October 1, 2014. Like the previous two releases, it was built by AtGames. It is the same as the Flashback 4 with the infrared wireless joysticks, but it adds 17 more games, increasing the total to 92 games.

Atari Flashback 6
The Atari Flashback 6 was released on September 15, 2015. Like the previous three releases, it was built by AtGames. It is the same as the Flashback 5 with the infrared wireless joysticks, but it adds 8 more games, increasing the total to 100 games.

Atari Flashback 7
The Atari Flashback 7 was released on October 1, 2016. Like the previous four releases, it was built by AtGames. It is the same as the Flashback 6 with the infrared wireless joysticks, but it adds one more game - Frogger - increasing the total to 101 games.

The Atari Flashback 7 Deluxe includes two wired paddle controllers in addition to the wireless joysticks.

Atari Flashback 8
The Atari Flashback 8 was released in September 2017, by AtGames. Several variations were released. A basic model, the Flashback 8 Classic, features 105 games and two wired controllers. The Flashback 8 Deluxe is identical, except that it includes a set of paddle controllers in addition to the joysticks.

The Flashback 8 Gold has 120 games and wireless controllers, as well as ports for 2600 controllers. The Gold edition has "save" and "pause" features, as well as scan line filtering. It also allows the player to rewind gameplay by several seconds. In addition, it features an SD card slot and introduces HDMI output for 720p.

The Atari Flashback 8 Gold Deluxe also has 120 games, but includes two wired paddles in addition to two wireless joysticks. The Flashback 8 Gold Activision Edition has 130 games, including several by Activision, although the other versions also feature some games by the company. All the games are emulated.

Atari Flashback 9
The Atari Flashback 9 was released on November 15, 2018, by AtGames. It includes two wired controllers and 110 games.

The Atari Flashback 9 Gold includes 120 games and wireless controllers. Both versions feature an SD card slot and an output of 720p. The SD slot is used for firmware updates, downloaded games, and saving and resuming game states.

Atari Flashback X

The Atari Flashback X was released in 2019 and attempts to capitalize on the mini console trend, started by releases like the NES Classic Edition and Sega Genesis Mini, by being a near perfect physical replica of an Atari 2600 in miniature form. Like the previous releases, it was built by AtGames.

The basic model includes two wired controllers and 110 games. The deluxe model includes 10 additional games. A firmware update through the AtGames website allows both models to download more games.

Atari Flashback 50th Anniversary Edition

The Atari Flashback 50th Anniversary Edition was released in 2022 at limited retailers. Physically it is a slight re-coloration of the Atari Flashback X. It features brass switches instead of chrome and has the Atari 50th logo stamped onto its wood veneer trim. Like the previous releases, it was built by AtGames.

The basic model includes two wired standard controllers and 110 games. The gold model includes two wired standard controllers, two wired paddle controllers and 130 games. Currently there are no firmware updates for either model to allow for the download of more games, but being physically based on the Flashback X hardware the potential is there.

Games by Flashback version

Handheld consoles

Atari Flashback Portable

In 2007, Vendel was working on a handheld console known as the Atari Flashback Portable. It would run on three "AAA" batteries, and would include a screen resolution of 320x240. It would feature AV output and two joystick controller ports for multiplayer. Games are loaded into internal 2MB memory by use of a USB cable. The release date was projected as early 2008 with a retail price of approximately $40. However, Vendel announced in 2010 that the project was not going to be released by Atari and no further information was released.

A new handheld console, also called the Atari Flashback Portable, was released in November 2016. It contains 60 games built in and an SD slot for downloaded games. It has a 3.2" LCD, AV output port and mini USB charge port.

A second edition of Atari Flashback Portable was released in September 2017. Like the first Atari Flashback Portable, it was built by AtGames. It includes 70 games with the most notable additions to this edition being four Namco games which are Dig Dug, Galaxian, Pac-Man, and Xevious. The version of Pac-Man included is a homebrew port that is more faithful to the original arcade game and not the original Atari 2600 port of Pac-Man released in 1982.

A third edition of the Atari Flashback Portable was released by AtGames in September 2018. The standard edition includes 80 games.

A fourth edition of the Atari Flashback Portable was released by AtGames in September 2019. It features a woodgrain-like body design that mirrors the woodgrain look on the original Atari 2600 console. The standard edition includes 80 games.

The second edition of the Flashback Portable includes the following games:

The third edition includes 80 games.

Other products
Atari Flashback Classics is a video game compilation of various Atari games, split into three volumes. The game was first released in 2016, for PlayStation 4 and Xbox One. It was released for Nintendo Switch and PlayStation Vita in 2018.

In October 2018, AtGames released Atari Flashback Blast!, a trio of wireless controllers each with 20 built-in games.

See also
 Atari Joystick Controller TV Video Game System
 Namco Plug & Play games
 NES Classic Edition
 Neo Geo X
 Super NES Classic Edition

Notes

References

External links

Archive of Atari Flashback product page.
Archive of  Atari Flashback 2 product page.
Atari Flashback 2 online manual: HTML, PDF

Flashback
Dedicated consoles
Atari 2600 hardware clones
2000s toys
2010s toys
2004 in video gaming
Products introduced in 2004